Zhengzhou University is a metro station of Zhengzhou Metro Line 1. The station lies beneath the crossing of Changchun Road and Kexue Avenue.

Station layout  
The station has 2 floors underground. The B1 floor is for the station concourse and the B2 floor is for the platforms and tracks. The station has one island platform and two tracks for Line 1.

Exits

Surroundings 
 Zhengzhou University

References 

Zhengzhou University
Stations of Zhengzhou Metro
Line 1, Zhengzhou Metro
Railway stations in China opened in 2017
Railway stations in China at university and college campuses